The Ligi Ndogo Soccer Club Academy, commonly known as simply Ligi Ndogo, is the youth team of Ligi Ndogo Sports Club, and acts as a feeder program for the senior team. The current academy director and under-17 head coach is Ibrahim Mbikalo.

The academy fields teams from under-9 to under-19 level that participate in various national and international competitions, but also accommodates boys and girls from the age of four upwards. Notable former graduates of the academy include Swedish international John Guidetti and Kenyan international Ayub Masika.

History
The academy was established on 1 January 2002 by current club chairman Chris Amimo and Karani Nyamu.  The academy's first season began in February 2002, as just a place for neighbourhood children to go and play some football. Upon discovering that many of the children actually had talent, the administration formed the various age groups found in the academy today and formed a "Planets" team, which consisted of the best players from these age groups, to represent the club at national and international tournaments.

In 2005, the senior football team was formed on the initiative of current academy director and former senior team coach, Ibrahim Mbikalo and Amimo. Ligi Ndogo gained their first honours by winning the Private Secondary Schools' League in 2005, and played in the Kiko Cup towards the end of the year, crashing out through a 3–2 loss to Kibera Combined on spot kicks.

Structure

The academy's program is divided into three seasons each calendar year: January–April, May–August and September–December, with a typical season lasting 10 to 12 weeks. Apart from being a football school with several semi-professional coaches on the payroll, the academy fielded an internal league season at each age level with regular matches, training sessions and tournaments. Upon registration, players are evaluated and placed in teams which are categorized based on age and skill level:
 "Atoms" – ages 4 to 7
 "Juniors" – ages 8 to 9
 "Lower Mids" – ages 10 to 12
 "Upper Mids" – ages 13 to 14

These categories are further divided into teams named after the planets of the Solar System. The atoms have five teams: Mercury, Jupiter, Mars, Neptune and Suns. The juniors have Neptune, Mars, Jupiter and Pluto while the Mids have Jupiter and Neptune. A formal program is also offered where parents can get involved as referees, linesmen, team parents, team sponsors, handlers and cheerleaders.

As the Football Kenya Federation does not organize national youth leagues in Kenya, teams from the academy regularly compete in the Keele International Cup (formerly the Umbro International Cup), which has been won before by the academy's various teams, as well as various tournaments within the country. Players from the academy have attracted attention from professional football clubs such as Crystal Palace, Everton and Liverpool.

Notable academy graduates
John Guidetti is a notable former player at the academy, having joined the under-13 team in 2003. After leaving in 2005 to return to IF Brommapojkarna, he signed a three-year-deal with Manchester City as a 16-year-old in 2008.

a.  Current club as of 7 October 2015.

Honours
 Kenya Private Secondary Schools League (1): 2005

References

External links
 The Academy at Ligi Ndogo's official website

Academy
Football academies in Africa
2002 establishments in Kenya